YUKO was a Ukrainian group that combines folk   and contemporary music.

Career
The group is a resident of the Masterskaya music label. In 2018, YUKO began to feature in Europe (at festivals in Poland and Hungary). In 2019, the band took part in the National Eurovision Song Contest 2019 with the song Galyna guliala, reaching the final.

In early 2019, on the eve of the national selection for Eurovision 2019, the Ukrainian media reported that the band "Yuko" includes Russians. According to Ukrainian journalists, Yulia Yurina is a Russian citizen who moved to Ukraine 7 years ago, but still has Russian citizenship. Only in December 2018 she received a permanent residence permit in Ukraine. It turned out that the band had concerts in Russia, but the musicians said that "we have not performed in Russia for a year."

Members
 Yulia Yurina is a  soloist of  band, professional folklorist. Ukrainian citizen.
Stas Koroliov  is a multi-instrumentalist. Previously performed with a solo project.

Discography
DITCH (2017)
DURA (2018)

References

Ukrainian LGBT rights activists

External links 
  Дуэт Yuko — новый проект лейбла Ивана Дорна
 YUKO: украинский фолк без компромиссов
  YUKO at last.fm

Musical groups established in 2017
Musical groups disestablished in 2020
Ukrainian pop music groups
Folk music groups
Electronic music duos
Folktronica musicians
The Voice of Ukraine contestants
2017 establishments in Ukraine
2020 disestablishments in Ukraine